The FIA WTCC Race of San Marino was a round of the World Touring Car Championship, which was held at the Autodromo Enzo e Dino Ferrari near Imola in Italy during the 2005 season.

In addition to the Race of Italy at Monza, a round at Imola was held during the 2005 season. As Imola held the San Marino Grand Prix despite being located in Italy, the Imola round of the WTCC was called the Race of San Marino. Imola also held an additional round in 2008, although this was called the Race of Europe.

Winners

San Marino
Race of San Marino
Imola Circuit